The Show! Music Core Chart is a record chart on the South Korean MBC television music program Show! Music Core. Every week, the show awards the best-performing single on the chart in the country during its live broadcast.

In 2021, 27 singles have ranked at number one on the chart and 19 music acts received first-place trophies. No release for the year achieved a perfect score, but "Antidote" by Kang Daniel, which attained the highest point total on the April 24 broadcast with 10,702 points. "Butter" by BTS was number 1 for 5 consecutive weeks. The artist with the most number of wins was IU with 10 total wins.

Scoring system

Chart history

See also 
 List of Show! Music Core Chart winners (2020)

References 

2021 in South Korean music
South Korea Show Music Core
Lists of number-one songs in South Korea